{{Infobox television
| image                = Rock Story titlecard.png
| image_upright        =
| image_size           = 250
| image_alt            = 
| caption              = 
| alt_name             = 
| genre                =  Telenovela  Musical drama<ref>{{cite web|url=http://www.purebreak.com.br/noticias/novela-rock-story-tiago-iorc-ludmilla-sandy-sia-e-os-hits-da-trilha-sonora-da-trama-da-globo/47133|title=Novela "Rock Story com mistura romance e música nova|website=Pure Break|language=pt }}</ref>
| creator              = Maria Helena Nascimento
| based_on             = 
| developer            = 
| writer               = 
| screenplay           = 
| story                = 
| director             = 
| creative_director    = Dennis Carvalho
| starring             = 
| theme_music_composer = 
| opentheme            = "Dê um Rolê" by Pitty
| endtheme             = 
| composer             = 
| country              = Brazil
| language             = Portuguese
| num_seasons          = 
| num_episodes         = 179 (135 International version)
| list_episodes        = 
| executive_producer   = 
| producer             = 
| editor               = 
| location             = Rio de Janeiro
| cinematography       = 
| camera               = Multi-camera
| runtime              = 37-46 minutes
| company              = Estúdios Globo
| budget               = 
| network              = TV Globo
| picture_format       = 1080i HDTV
| audio_format         = 
| released             = 
| first_aired          = 
| last_aired           = 
| related              = 
}}Rock Story is a Brazilian telenovela broadcast on TV Globo, created by Maria Helena Nascimento with the text supervisor as Ricardo Linhares, and directed by Dennis Carvalho. It originally aired from 9 November 2016, replacing Haja Coração at the traditional 7 p.m. timeslot to 5 June 2017.

It stars Vladimir Brichta, Nathalia Dill, Rafael Vitti, João de Castro, Viviane Araújo, Herson Capri, Ana Beatriz Nogueira, Paulo Betti, Laila Garin and Alinne Moraes.Rock Story'' tells the trajectory of the rocker Guilherme Santiago, who was very successful in the 90s and now tries to return to the charts. In the plot, set in Rio, love and music run together, approaching hearts that have the same ideals.

Plot 
Gui Santiago (Vladimir Brichta) is a rock singer who has made a great success in the 1990s who tries to go back to fame again. In love with Diana (Alinne Moraes), he lives a tempestuous relationship with her and they have a daughter together, Chiara (Lara Cariello). Gordo (Herson Capri), Diana's father and owner of a record label was the one who made Gui to rise to stardom. The assaulting Leo Régis (Rafael Vitti), causes Gui almost lose everything because he accuses the teen idol of plagiarism on his dream song that he was to use for his comeback to the music scene.

The situation becomes complicated when Leo becomes romantically involved with Diana and Gui discovers being a father of Zac (Nicolas Prattes), the son he had with a fan. There is also Lázaro (João Vicente de Castro), Gui's childhood friend and manager of both Gui and Leo. Lázaro has been in love with Diana since he was young thus he is envious of Gui. In the middle of several conflicts, Gui meets ballet teacher Julia (Nathália Dill). Julia became a fugitive, after being used by her boyfriend Alex (Caio Paduan) to smuggle drugs to the United States. Julia trusts confides to the Gui. This later leads him into  confusion about what he feels for his wife and the newly met lass. The new relationship and the emergence of the boyband formed by Zac, Nicolau (Danilo Mesquita), Tom (João Vítor Silva) and JF (Maicon Rodrigues), aiming to topple his rival, begins a transformation in the life of Gui.

Cast

Special Guest

Soundtrack

Volume 1

Volume 2

Ratings 

Since it launched in Brazil, the show averaged over 37 million viewers, and a 44% of the audience share. On social media, the series saw more than 31,000 online comments during its premiere.

References

External links 
  
 

2016 telenovelas
TV Globo telenovelas
Brazilian telenovelas
2016 Brazilian television series debuts
2017 Brazilian television series endings
Brazilian LGBT-related television shows
Portuguese-language telenovelas
Musical telenovelas
Television series about fictional musicians
Television series about twins
Alcohol abuse in television